Attack and Retreat is a Soviet-Italian war drama film directed by Giuseppe De Santis and Dmitri Vasilyev in 1964. The movie follows the steps of Italian soldiers of the Italian Army in Russia fighting on the Eastern Front on Hitler's side. Heavily based on diaries and memories of real war veterans.

Cast
Arthur Kennedy	as Ferro Maria Ferri
Peter Falk	as 	        Lieutenant Mario Salvioni
Zhanna Prokhorenko	 as 	Katya
Raffaele Pisu	as	Libero Gabrielli
Tatyana Samojlova	as	Sonya
Andrea Checchi	as	Colonel Sermonti
Riccardo Cucciolla	as	Giuseppe Sanna
Valeri Somov	as 	Giuliani
Nino Vingelli	as 	Amalfitano
Lev Prygunov	as	Loris Bazzocchi
Grigory Mikhaylov	as 	Russian Partisan (as Grigorij Mikhailov)
 Erwin Knausmyuller as  German colonel
Gino Pernice	as	Collodi
Boris Kozhukhov	as 	Major
Vincenzo Polizzi	as 	Sicilian

External links
 
 Boris Bondarenko (1976). Pyramide. Moscow: Soviet writer. 472 p.

1965 films
Eastern Front of World War II films
1960s Italian-language films
Films directed by Giuseppe De Santis
Films scored by Armando Trovajoli
1960s war drama films
Soviet war drama films
Russian war drama films
1960s Russian-language films
Soviet multilingual films
Italian multilingual films
1960s multilingual films
English-language Italian films
English-language Soviet films
Italian war drama films
1965 drama films
Soviet World War II films
Russian World War II films
Italian World War II films
Macaroni Combat films
1960s Italian films